The Asian Semi-Longhair is a cat breed similar to the Asian Shorthair except it has semi-long fur. The breed is also known by the name Tiffanie. It is recognized in any of the Asian Shorthair or Burmese colors and patterns. Like the Asian Shorthair, the breed was developed in Asia and is not currently recognized by any U.S. Registries. It has full recognition in the GCCF.  It is related to, and in some registries distinct from, the Chantilly-Tiffany or Foreign Longhair, the North American variant.

History
The Tiffanie was developed in the 1980s in the United Kingdom as a longhaired version of the Asian Shorthair. The breed origins can be traced back to matings between a longhaired cat and a Burmese. They are very similar to Burmillas.

Temperament
The Tiffanie is a gentle, active and curious breed. Cats of this breed are attached to their owners, but do not always get along with other cats, since they can be quite jealous. The Asian Semi-longhair is spirited and expects its keeper to dedicate a lot of time to it. Asian Semi-longhairs can be very vocal and are not recommended
for small apartments.

References

External links 

Asian Semi-longhair Description
FBRL Breed Page: Asian

Cat breeds
Cat breeds originating in the United Kingdom